Jarred Michael Fayson (born October 13, 1987) is an American football wide receiver who is currently a free agent. He was signed by the New Orleans Saints as an undrafted free agent in 2011. He played college football at Illinois.

Professional career

New Orleans Saints
Fayson was signed as an undrafted free agent by the New Orleans Saints on July 27, 2011. He was waived/injured on August 30, 2011.

Indianapolis Colts
Fayson was signed to the practice squad of the Indianapolis Colts on November 22, 2011.

New England Patriots
Fayson was signed to the practice squad of the New England Patriots on November 1, 2012.

New Orleans Saints
Fayson was signed to a reserve/future contract with the New Orleans Saints on January 2, 2013. On August 19, 2013, he was waived by the Saints.

Toronto Argonauts
On October 9, 2013, Fayson was signed by the Toronto Argonauts of the Canadian Football League to a practice roster agreement. He was released by the Argonauts on November 11, 2014. On January 7, 2015, Fayson re-signed with the Argonauts.

References

External links
Toronto Argonauts bio
Illinois Fighting Illini bio

1987 births
Living people
People from North Charleston, South Carolina
American football wide receivers
Illinois Fighting Illini football players
Indianapolis Colts players